Pavel Razmikovich Dalaloyan (22 November 1978 – 22 June 2017) was a Russian football player.

Career
Danaloyan played football for FC Lokomotiv Liski before joining FC Uralan Elista where he would make 4 Russian Premier League appearances.

Death
Dalaloyan was killed when an automobile struck him as he was walking on a sidewalk in Voronezh.

References

1978 births
2017 deaths
Russian footballers
FC Elista players
Russian Premier League players
FC Metallurg Lipetsk players
FC Slavyansk Slavyansk-na-Kubani players
Association football forwards
Road incident deaths in Russia
Pedestrian road incident deaths
Sportspeople from Voronezh